The women's 100 metres at the 2012 World Junior Championships in Athletics will be held at the Estadi Olímpic Lluís Companys on 10 and 11 July.

Reigning champion Jodie Williams was eligible to defend her 2010 title, but did not compete.

Medalists

Records
, the existing world junior and championship records were as follows.

Results

Heats
Qualification: The first 3 of each heat (Q) and the 3 fastest times (q) qualified

Semi-final
Qualification: The first 2 of each heat (Q) and the 2 fastest times (q) qualified

Final
Wind: +1.7 m/s

Participation
According to an unofficial count, 47 athletes from 35 countries participated in the event.

References

External links
WJC12 100 metres schedule

100 metres
100 metres at the World Athletics U20 Championships
2012 in women's athletics